Masood Textile Mills (MTM) is a vertically-integrated textile manufacturing company based out of Faisalabad, Pakistan with in-house yarn, yarn, knitting, fabric dyeing, processing, laundry and apparel manufacturing facilities. MTM is publicly listed on the Pakistan Stock Exchange. It used to be the largest knit-wear manufacturer and exporter in Pakistan.

In 2014 it posted a pre-tax profit of Rs 1.1 billion, which was 13% higher than its pre-tax earnings in the preceding year. Shanghai Challenge Textile Company acquired 24.3% shares in Masood Textile Mills in a privately negotiated deal.

References

Companies listed on the Pakistan Stock Exchange
Companies based in Faisalabad
Textile companies of Pakistan